Roberta Hubley (born May 27, 1941) is a Canadian former politician. Hubley served in the Legislative Assembly of Prince Edward Island from 1989 to 1996. She represented the electoral district of 3rd Kings as a member of the Prince Edward Island Liberal Party.

Hubley was born in Hopefield, Prince Edward Island.

References

1941 births
Living people
People from Kings County, Prince Edward Island
Prince Edward Island Liberal Party MLAs
Women MLAs in Prince Edward Island